Albanopolis ( or Albanët) was a city in ancient Roman Macedon specifically in Epirus Nova, the city of the Albanoi, an Illyrian tribe. Albanopolis has been located by various scholars at the modern-day village of Zgërdhesh or at Krujë. The ancient city  may correspond with later mentions of the settlement called Arbanon and Albanon during the Middle Ages, although it is not certain this was the same place. The city appears at 150 AD almost 300 years after Roman conquest of the region.

Attestation
The toponym Albanopolis has been found on a funeral inscription in Gorno Sonje, near the city of Skopje (ancient Scupi), present-day North Macedonia. It was discovered in 1931 by Nikola Vulić and its text was analyzed and published in 1982 by Borka Dragojević-Josifovska. The inscription in Latin reads "POSIS MESTYLU F[ILIUS] FL[AVIA] DELVS MVCATI F[ILIA] DOM[O] ALBANOP[OLI] IPSA DELVS". It is translated as "Posis Mestylu, son of Flavia, daughter of Delus Mucati, who comes from Albanopolis". It dates to the end of the 1st century CE or the beginning of the 2nd century CE.

Ptolemy (100-170 CE) is the only author who mentions Albanopolis. He mentions it in the third book of Geographia as a city of a tribe he refers to as the Albanoi. They were a people who lived in the region between Mat and Shkumbin. Johann Georg von Hahn first noted that the suffix -polis ("city") was probably added at a later date by other authors as in other editions it is mentioned as "Albanos polis" or "Albanos".

Location
The first scholar to advance the idea that Zgërdhesh was the site of the ancient Albanopolis was Austrian diplomat Johann Georg von Hahn. Zgërdhesh was also visited during World War I by Camillo Praschniker, an Austrian archaeologist, but his visit was short and he did not have time to draw any conclusions. According to historian Selim Islami, Hahn's hypothesis is not conclusive, but may have merit, and deserves to be pursued in the future.

See also 
Albanoi
Illyria
Albania (placename)
List of ancient cities in Illyria
Zgërdhesh

References

Cities in ancient Illyria
Illyrian Albania
Archaeological sites in Albania
Former populated places in the Balkans